Hassan Sani  (born 31 August 1958) is a former Malaysian football player.

Career Overview 
He played for Sabah and Kuala Lumpur in the Malaysian League and Malaysia Cup in the late 1970s and in the 1980s. Hassan start representing Malaysia in youth competition from 1977–1978. He brought into the senior team in 1978 by Karl Heinz Weigang. He is remembered as a member of the potent strike force comprising the likes of Mokhtar Dahari and James Wong (another player from Sabah). He was called "lipas kudung" because of his agility and was a member of the Malaysia squad that qualified for the 1980 Olympics in Moscow after defeating South Korea in 1980 Asian Olympic Qualifying Tournaments. Unfortunately, Malaysia did not go as it joined the US-led boycott towards Soviet Union for its role in supporting the Democratic Republic of Afghanistan against the Islamic Unity of Afghanistan Mujahideen.

Further career 
In 1996, Hassan join Malaysia national beach soccer team and played in the 1999 Beach Soccer World Championship as well. In 2015, he together with Wong was appointed as one of the members for the management team of Sabah FA.

Honours 
Sabah
 Malaysian League Tournament runner-up: 1979

 Borneo Cup: 1977, 1978, 1979, 1980, 1982

Kuala Lumpur
 Malaysian First Division: 1986

 Malaysia Cup: 1987

International 
 SEA Games: 1979

 Pestabola Merdeka: 1979

Individual 
 Borneo Cup top scorer: 1982

 AFC Asian All Stars: 1982

 SAFA Commemoration Award: 2019

Order
  :
  Commander of the Order of Kinabalu (PGDK) - Datuk (2016)

References 

Malaysian footballers
Malaysia international footballers
People from Labuan
Living people
1958 births
Sabah F.C. (Malaysia) players
Malaysian people of Malay descent
Malaysian people of Banjar descent
Southeast Asian Games gold medalists for Malaysia
Southeast Asian Games medalists in football
Association football forwards
Competitors at the 1979 Southeast Asian Games